Patrick John Flueger (born December 10, 1983) is an American actor, known for a lead role as Shawn Farrell in the television series The 4400. He currently appears in a main role on Chicago P.D., playing Adam Ruzek.

Life and career
Flueger was born in Red Wing, Minnesota, the eldest of three siblings. He attended Red Wing High School graduating in 2002. Flueger's first significant role was in the Disney film The Princess Diaries. Next followed several television appearances, including JAG, Law & Order: Special Victims Unit, and CSI: Miami. He then landed the role of Shawn Farrell in the USA Network series The 4400 (2004–07). While still working on The 4400, Flueger got the role of Rusty in the film The World's Fastest Indian, starring Anthony Hopkins. In The World's Fastest Indian, Flueger starred alongside Antony Starr. Flueger was later cast as the American version of the character Starr played in Outrageous Fortune, retitled in the U.S. version as Scoundrels, airing on ABC during the summer of 2010. He is slated to appear in several other movie roles, including Blowtorch Films' You Are Here, The Job based on the Shem Bitterman play, and Chris Moore's Kill Theory.

In February 2010, Flueger was among those screen tested for the role of Captain America in the 2011 feature film.

Since 2011, his performances have been credited using his full name - Patrick John Flueger.

In August 2013, Flueger joined the cast for the Chicago Fire spin-off Chicago P.D. as rookie officer Ruzek. The show premiered January 8, 2014.

Appeared in Law & Order: Special Victims Unit and Criminal Minds.

Filmography

Film

Television

References

External links
 
 PopGurls Interview: Patrick Flueger

1983 births
Male actors from Minnesota
American male film actors
American male television actors
Living people
People from Red Wing, Minnesota
21st-century American male actors